Saint Abraham's Church (Persian: کلیسای حضرت ابراهیم) is a Dominican Catholic church in Tehran, Iran.

History
In 1962 the Vatican asked the Dominican Order to return to Iran. The Dominican province of Ireland agreed to establish a community in Tehran. Father William Barden (who later became Archbishop) was the first to arrive, and was soon joined by Father Hugh Brennan. They rented a house near Tehran University in Professor Brown Street. They dedicated it to Our Lady of the Rosary, like the earlier house in Isfahan, and it was known as "Rosary House".
On 23 May 1966 the new Dominican House and Church of Saint Abraham was opened in Jamalzadeh Shomali Street. The Irish Dominican province still staff the church.

The church is dedicated to Saint Abraham. Abraham is Father in Faith of three religions, Christianity, Islam and Judaism. By choosing Abraham as the patron of the church, the Dominicans signaled their wish for it to become a place of study, encounter, and understanding between people of different faiths.

References
Notes

Sources
Saint Abraham's Church

Roman Catholic churches in Iran
Churches in Tehran
Dominican churches
1966 in Iran